Brownheaded leafroller may refer to three species of moth in the family Tortricidae:

Ctenopseustis fraterna of New Zealand's North Island
Ctenopseustis herana of New Zealand's South, Steward and Chatham islands
Ctenopseustis obliquana of New Zealand and an introduced species in Hawaii

Animal common name disambiguation pages